Cui Yanfeng is a Paralympian athlete from China competing mainly in category T54 middle-distance events.

Yanfeng competed in both the 800m and 1500m at the 2008 Summer Paralympics in his home country.  He was also part of the gold medal-winning Chinese 4 × 400 m.
 His teammates were Zhang Lixin, Zhao Ji, and Li Huzhao. He is married to Liu Wenjun who is also a Paralympic wheelchair racer.

References

Paralympic athletes of China
Athletes (track and field) at the 2008 Summer Paralympics
Athletes (track and field) at the 2012 Summer Paralympics
Athletes (track and field) at the 2016 Summer Paralympics
Paralympic gold medalists for China
Medalists at the 2008 Summer Paralympics
Medalists at the 2016 Summer Paralympics
Living people
Chinese male middle-distance runners
Chinese male sprinters
Chinese male wheelchair racers
Year of birth missing (living people)
Paralympic medalists in athletics (track and field)
21st-century Chinese people
Medalists at the 2010 Asian Para Games
Medalists at the 2014 Asian Para Games